Malte Spitz (born 14 April 1984) is a German Green Party politician and Executive Committee member. He works on media and privacy issues.

A candidate for the Bundestag in the September 2013 national election in Germany. He is known for suing T-Mobile for collecting metadata. He is a TED Speaker and founded the German NGO Society for Civil Liberties, focusing on strategic litigation for human rights.

References

External links
 Your phone company is watching - TEDGlobal 2012
 Tell-all telephone

Living people
Alliance 90/The Greens politicians
Privacy activists
1984 births